Ust-Porozikha is a rural locality (a selo) and the administrative center of Voykovsky Selsoviet, Shipunovsky District, Altai Krai, Russia. The population was 460 as of 2013. There are 6 streets.

Geography 
Ust-Porozikha is located 51 km ESE of Shipunovo (the district's administrative centre) by road. Chupino is the nearest rural locality.

References 

Rural localities in Shipunovsky District